In mathematics, especially in singularity theory, the splitting lemma is a useful result due to René Thom which provides a way of simplifying the local expression of a function usually applied in a neighbourhood of a degenerate critical point.

Formal statement
Let  be a smooth function germ, with a critical point at 0 (so  for ). Let V be a subspace of  such that the restriction f |V is non-degenerate, and write B for the Hessian matrix of this restriction.

This result is often referred to as the parametrized Morse lemma, which can be seen by viewing y as the parameter. It is the gradient version of the implicit function theorem.

Extensions
There are extensions to infinite dimensions, to complex analytic functions, to functions invariant under the action of a compact group, ...

References
 .
 .

Singularity theory
Functions and mappings